Backporch Revolution is an independent record label, netlabel, and artists' collective from New Orleans, Louisiana. They release material by Chef Menteur, potpie, and other New Orleans underground artists. In 2006, Backporch Revolution released the compilation Proud to Swim Home: A Backporch Revolution Compilation for New Orleans, a benefit disc for groups assisting New Orleans' recovery after Hurricane Katrina.

Roster
Archipelago
Becca Rice
The Bastard Sons of Morton Subotnick
The Buttons
Chef Menteur
Electrical Spectacle
B. Killingsworth
Geisterfahrer
King Ghidorah
Liteworks
Murmur
potpie
pinkySqueak
Shinola
Time Promises Power
The Uptown Cajun All-stars
Triumph of Lethargy Skinned Alive to Death

See also
 List of record labels

References

External links
Official site

American independent record labels
Record labels established in 1995